The 1953 Cork Senior Hurling Championship was the 65th staging of the Cork Senior Hurling Championship since its establishment by the Cork County Board in 1887. The championship ended on 25 October 1953.

Avondhu were the defending champions.

On 25 October 1953, Glen Rovers won the championship following an 8-5 to 4-3 defeat of Sarsfields in the final. This was their 14th championship title overall and their first title in three championship seasons.

Team changes

To Championship

Returned after a one-year absence
 Seandún

Promoted from the Cork Intermediate Hurling Championship
 Bandon
 Nemo Rangers

From Championship

Regraded to the Cork Intermediate Hurling Championship
 Rathluirc

Regraded to the Cork Junior Hurling Championship
 Ballincollig

Results

First round

 Duhallow received a bye in this round, however, they later withdrew from the championship.

Second round

Blackrock were readmitted to the championship and Midleton, who they had unsuccessfully objected to at an earlier date, were ruled out of the championship.

Semi-finals

Final

References

Cork Senior Hurling Championship
Cork Senior Hurling Championship